Journey to the Seventh Planet is a 1962 Danish-American science fiction film. It was directed by Sid Pink, written by Pink and Ib Melchior,  and shot in Denmark with a budget of only US$75,000.

Uranus, the seventh planet in the solar system, has not been charted by the United Nations' Space Fleet. Therefore, in 2001, an international crew has been dispatched to Uranus by the United Nations, which has become a world government, on a space exploration mission. The film's ideas of astronauts exploring outer space only to confront their inner mindscapes and memories precede the similar-themed 1972 film Solaris by a full decade (although the novel Solaris was published a year prior to this film). The film is also reminiscent of Ray Bradbury's 1948 short story "Mars Is Heaven!" and the manifestations of the subconscious in "Forbidden Planet".

Plot
In the year 2001, while an international five man team is on their way to Uranus, an alien presence briefly assumes control of the crew's minds. They awaken safely but notice that a long – and unexplained – period of time has passed. Upon landing, the crew finds a forested land oddly like Earth's, rather than the cold, bleak world they were expecting. This forest is surrounded by a mysterious barrier. One of the crew pushes his arm through the barrier, only to have it frozen.

New features and forms begin to appear each time they are imagined by the crew. A familiar-looking village appears, complete with attractive women the various male crew members have known in the past. Soon, they must face a series of strange beasts including a giant bipedal cyclopean rodent and a lobster-like insect. The crew realizes that they have been the victims of mind control by a gigantic one-eyed brain living in a cave. There, they are confronted by the "Being", whose mysterious brain cuts to the inner thoughts of the explorers and causes their thoughts to appear as seemingly real. The brain-Being plans to possess the astronauts' bodies and have them take it with them back to Earth where it will implement a plan for global domination. The crew gradually come to realize their peril and start to fight back against the presence, even eliciting aid from the sympathetic women. They must then confront the Being in its lair while it assaults each with monsters spawned from their fears.

Cast

 John Agar as Captain Don Graham (American)
 Carl Ottosen as Commander Eric Nilsson (British)
 Peter Monch as Lt. Karl Heinrich (West Germany)
 Ove Sprogøe as Barry O'Sullivan (Irish)
 Louis Miehe-Renard as Svend Viltoft (Swedish)
 Ann Smyrner as Ingrid
 Greta Thyssen as Greta
 Ulla Moritz as Lise Martens
 Mimi Heinrich as Ursula
 Annie Birgit Garde as Ellen
 Bente Juel as Colleen

Reception
AllMovie reviewer Craig Butler wrote that although the film "is a cheesy, terribly bad slice of low-budget science fiction," it was also "one of those bad films that's quite a lot of fun to laugh at. It's also rather endearing." Writing for Reel Reviews, Loron Hays described the film as "laughably silly" and that "[t]his is not a good film. But you will laugh."

See also
 List of American films of 1962

References

Further reading
 Sidney W. Pink: So You Want to Make Movies (Pineapple Press, 1989)
 Nicolas Barbano: Twice Told Tails – The Two Versions of Reptilicus, in Video Watchdog #96 (2003)
 Forrest J Ackerman: Journey to the 7th Planet, in Famous Monsters of Filmland #43 (1967)

External links

 
 Journey to the Seventh Planet review at Badmovies.org
 Journey to the Seventh Planet film trailer at YouTube

1962 films
1960s science fiction horror films
American International Pictures films
American science fiction horror films
1960s Danish-language films
English-language Danish films
1960s English-language films
Films about astronauts
Films set in 2001
Films using stop-motion animation
Fiction set on Uranus
Films directed by Sidney W. Pink
Danish science fiction horror films
Films scored by Ronald Stein
1960s multilingual films
American multilingual films
Danish multilingual films
1960s American films